Mordellistena martapurana is a species of beetles in the family Mordellidae. It is found in the Malay Archipelago.

References

martapurana
Beetles described in 1925